Ryzhikh is a Russian surname.
 
 Anastasija Reiberger (Nastja Ryjikh; born 1977), Russian-born German pole vaulter
 Sergei Ryzhikh (born 1979), Russian football player
 Lisa Ryzih (born 1988), Russian-born German pole vaulter, sister of Anastasija

Russian-language surnames